Youssef Hossam (born 3 June 1998) is an Egyptian former professional tennis player who was banned from tennis for life, after he was found guilty of 21 match-fixing and other corruption offences. He was banned in a decision made official 4 May, after a hearing held 9-11 March 2020.

Tennis career
Hossam was born in Giza, Egypt, and lives in Egypt. He had a career-high ATP singles ranking of No. 291, achieved on 11 December 2017. He also had a career-high ATP doubles ranking of No. 562, achieved on 27 November 2017. Hossam had a career-high ranking of no. 8 on the ITF Junior Circuit, achieved on 4 April 2016.

Hossam represented Egypt at the Davis Cup, where he had a W/L record of 9–2.

Tennis lifetime ban
Hossam was found to have effected 21 breaches of the Tennis Anti-Corruption program from 2015 to 2019: eight cases of match-fixing, six cases of facilitating gambling, two cases of soliciting other players not to use best efforts, three failures to report corrupt approaches and two failures to co-operate with a Tennis Integrity Unit investigation. It also ruled he had conspired with others to carry out betting-related corruption at the lower levels of tennis.
The TIU stated: "As a result of his conviction, Mr Hossam is now permanently excluded from competing in or attending any sanctioned tennis event organised or recognised by the governing bodies of the sport."

The news came less than two years after his older brother Karim Hossam also was banned for life and was fined $15,000 in 2018, after being found guilty on 16 corruption charges relating to offenses from 2013 to 2017.

Future and Challenger finals

Singles: 12 (9-3)

Doubles: 6 (2-4)

See also
Match fixing in tennis
Tennis Integrity Unit

References

External links

1998 births
Living people
Egyptian male tennis players
Sportspeople from Giza
Match fixers
Tennis controversies
Match fixing in tennis
Sportspeople banned for life